Crossidius hirtipes is a species of beetle in the family Cerambycidae. It was described by John Lawrence LeConte in 1854.

References

Trachyderini
Beetles described in 1854